Frank Roy Hodson, FBA (born 1930), commonly known as Roy Hodson, is a British archaeologist. He was Professor of Prehistoric Archaeology at the Institute of Archaeology at University College London from 1973 to 1993.

Career 
Born in Liverpool in 1930, he attended the University of Cambridge, graduating in 1953 with a classics degree; he then completed the Diploma in Prehistoric Archaeology at the University of Cambridge (1954) and a PhD (1957). In 1958, he supervised Mortimer Wheeler's Charsada excavations and then was appointed Lecturer in Prehistoric Archaeology at the Institute the Archaeology in 1959. He succeeded John D. Evans as the Institute's Professor of Prehistoric Archaeology in 1973, retiring in 1993. His work involved the early application of computing to archaeological research.

Honours and awards 
In 1984, Hodson was elected a Fellow of the British Academy, the United Kingdom's national academy for the humanities and social sciences.

References 

Living people
1930 births
British archaeologists
Alumni of the University of Cambridge
Academics of the UCL Institute of Archaeology
Fellows of the British Academy